Mossuril District is a district of Nampula Province in north-eastern Mozambique based in the principle town of the same name.
Mossuril is a coastal district located in the Bay of Mossuril. It is eight kilometres from Mozambique Island by boat or approximately 51 kilometres by road. The district is said to be home to the oldest surviving European building in the Southern Hemisphere, the church of 'Nossa Senhora dos Remédios' in the village of Cabaceira. The beaches of Chocas Mar, at the far tip of the district, are also a popular tourist attraction.  

The End of the Road Festival (Portuguese: Festival Fim do Caminho) is an annual film festival that takes place in August that is held in Mossuril, Mozambique Island and Nampula, and headquartered in Mossuril. 

Houses in this district are mostly built of local materials such as mud and grass cover, and were greatly impacted by Tropical Cyclone Gombe. It is estimated that around 1600 houses were destroyed in this cyclone in Mossuril.

Demography
In the 2017 Census, Mossuril District was reported to have a population of 174,641 residents. (male: 90,095; female: 84,546)

In 2007, the Census indicated a population of 116,301 residents. With an area of 3428  km² , the population density was around 33.93 inhabitants per km².

According to the 1997 Census, the district had 89,457 inhabitants and an area of 3,428 km², resulting in a population density of 26.1 inhabitants per km².

Administrative Districts
The district is divided into three administrative posts ( Lunga , Matibane and Mossuril ), made up of the following localities:

Administrative Post of Lunga :

- Lunga

Matibane Administrative Post :

- Matibane

Administrative Post of Mossuril :

- Mossuril village

- Namitatari

Further reading
District profile (PDF) 
End of the Road Festival - website
Assessment report on Cyclone Gombe

Districts in Nampula Province